The Rossel-Peugeot monoplane was a French experimental aircraft built in the early 1910s.

Specifications

References

Further reading

Single-engined tractor aircraft
Aircraft first flown in 1910
Rotary-engined aircraft
High-wing aircraft
1910s French experimental aircraft